Caio Horowicz (born 24 January 1996) is a Brazilian actor. He became known for starring the TV Series "Boca a Boca" by Netflix. She won the 2015 Festival do Rio in the Supporting Actor category and the 2020 Prêmio Contigo in the Best Actor category.

Filmography

Movies

Television

Awards and nominations

References

External links
 

1986 births
Living people